Vallet-Danuser House is a historic home located near Hermann, Gasconade County, Missouri. The rear ell was built about 1855 and main section about 1865.  It is a two-story, ell-shaped, red brick I-house.  It features a subterranean vaulted wine cellar. Also on the property are the contributing tenant house, smokehouse and barn.

It was listed on the National Register of Historic Places in 1982.

References

Houses on the National Register of Historic Places in Missouri
Houses completed in 1865
Buildings and structures in Gasconade County, Missouri
National Register of Historic Places in Gasconade County, Missouri